Parlement is a comedy television series created by , co-produced in France, Belgium and Germany, and first broadcast on france.tv, the VOD platform of France Télévisions, in April 2020. The show is performed in three languages: French, English and German.

The series recounts the adventures and misadventures of Samy Kantor, a young French parliamentary assistant, who arrives for his first day in Brussels just after the Brexit referendum. Samy is completely inexperienced, but somehow finds himself responsible for getting an amendment on shark finning passed by the European Parliament. His task is not helped by the fact that his boss, the MEP Michel Specklin, is both incompetent and indifferent. Samy is obliged to learn quickly how to make the right alliances.

Seasons
The first season was broadcast in Germany on One. The second season was filmed between July and September 2021 and broadcast online in France from 9 May 2022 and online in Germany from 24 October 2022 as well as on One on 31 October and 7 November 2022. The third season was filmed in autumn 2022, partially in Berlaymont, the Commission headquarters.

Cast
Source: Allocine

  as Samy
 Liz Kingsman as Rose
 Philippe Duquesne as Michel
 William Nadylam as Eamon
 Christiane Paul as Ingeborg
 Lucas Englander as Torsten
 Jane Turner as Sharon
 Niccolo Senni as Guido
 Carole Weyers as Janet

References

External links 
 Official site — france.tv
 

France Télévisions television comedy
2020 French television series debuts
European Union in fiction
Political satirical television series
2020s French comedy television series